Chan Siu Ki (born 14 July 1985 in Hong Kong) is a Hong Kongese professional footballer who currently plays as a striker for Hong Kong First Division club Eastern District. He is the all-time top scorer for the Hong Kong national team with 40 goals.

Club career

Early career
Chan was spotted by the management of Tai Po when he was playing amateur football. At that time, he was working in a store operated by his family. He was responsible for stock delivery and eventually developed a strong physique. He played for Tai Po in the Hong Kong Third Division. He was spotted by Rangers and joined them. However, he was almost immediately loaned and then sold to Kitchee and thus never played for Rangers.

At Kitchee, Chan developed into a strong and pacy striker as the club employed a 4–3–3 system. As he continued to impress, he was called up to the Hong Kong team in 2005. However, he was later involved in several disciplinary incidents at Kitchee and was suspended from playing duties by the club management. At the end of 2007–08 season, he joined arch-rivals South China for HKD $800,000, breaking the former transfer fee record of $500,000, paid by South China for Chan Wai Ho.

South China
At South China, Chan inherited the no. 7 shirt vacated by Au Wai Lun. In the 2008–2009 season, he primarily played on the right wing because the centre forward position was often occupied by Detinho or Cacá. In the 2009–10 season, with the signing of right winger Lee Wai Lim, Chan competed with new signing Leandro Carrijó for his preferred centre forward position after Cacá's return to Brazil. On 1 August 2009, at the Panasonic Invitation Cup, Chan scored the first goal in South China's 2–0 victory over Tottenham Hotspur with an dipping half-volley from 30 yards. Subsequently, after the two clubs forged a partnership, he joined the Spurs for a ten-day trial at some point during December 2009.

His trial was terminated prematurely as he was recalled by the Hong Kong U-23s progressed into the final of the 2009 East Asian Games. He was ranked 63rd in IFFHS World's Top Goal Scorer of the Year by International Federation of Football History & Statistics alongside Eduardo Da Silva, Mario Gómez and Fernando Torres.

In the 2009 AFC Cup, Chan was red-carded at the end of the quarter final first leg against Neftchi Farg'ona and was suspended for two games. He returned in the semi-final second leg to a packed Hong Kong Stadium, but was unable to help South China overturn a 1–2 deficit to Kuwait SC. The club eventually lost 1–3 and went out of the tournament.

On 15 December 2009, Chan scored a hat-trick for South China against Shatin. On 24 January 2010, Chan scored 4 goals against Happy Valley as South China won 6–2. This was the first time he had scored 4 goals in a local league match. On 30 January, Chan scored a goal to help South China overturn a 0–2 deficit to win the 2009–10 Hong Kong Senior Challenge Shield, 4–2. Chan was the tournament's top scorer with 4 goals and he was also named the Best Player. On 5 May, he was diagnosed with an osteophyte. But he still played in the second half of the game against Al Riffa in the 2010 AFC Cup. South China in the end lost the game 1–3.

In the 2010–11 season, Chan scored against Sun Hei but was then involved with a collision with teammate Kwok Kin Pong, which resulted in a left knee ligament injury that sidelined him for a month. He returned from injuries in November to score two goals for South China against Kitchee, but could not prevent Kitchee from winning 4–3. On 2 February 2011, he scored two goals against Sun Hei SC to help South China win 3–2 and move back to the top of the league table.

In the 2011 AFC Cup, Chan scored the equalising goal from a Mateja Kezman cross for South China at home against Persipura Jayapura. In the away game to East Bengal, he was sent off after two bookable offences. In May, after teammate Kwok Kin Pong scored with a diving header in a Hong Kong FA Cup match between South China and Sun Hei SC, Chan rushed in to celebrate with Kwok, but his slide did not stop in time and caught Kwok in the face. The video was posted on the internet and picked up by Yahoo!'s Dirty Tackle.

On 20 November 2011, Chan was involved in a scuffle in a match away to Pegasus. In the confusion, he was seen on television to slapping Karl Dodd. Dodd retaliated and punched Chan in the face, resulting in him rolling on the ground. Dodd was sent off but Chan only received a yellow card. Chan has since apologised on his Facebook account. Chan only received a warning letter and escaped punishment from HKFA's disciplinary committee for his altercation with Dodd, and Chan was himself surprised by the verdict. He scored his first goal of the season for South China on 24 November when he headed in a cross from Kwok Kin Pong to help South China progress to the semi-final of the 2011–12 Hong Kong Senior Challenge Shield by beating Sham Shui Po by 2–1 (aggregate 3–2). Amidst his second smoking scandal in 4 months, South China's chairman Steven Lo announced on his official blog on 23 May 2012 that Chan's contract had been terminated by the club.

Guangdong Sunray Cave
On 10 July 2012, Chan announced that he had joined China League One club Guangdong Sunray Cave for a 12-month contract. On 11 August 2012, he scored his first goal in China League One in the match between Guangdong Sunray Cave and Chengdu Blades, where Guangdong Sunray Cave lost to Chengdu Blades 1–2.

Return to South China

On 31 December 2013, South China's boss Steven Lo announced that Chan would rejoin South China and be given the number 7 shirt. With Chan in the lineup, South China won their first silverware in three years, capturing the 2013–14 Hong Kong Senior Challenge Shield.

At the first annual Hong Kong Community Cup in 2014, Chan scored a goal and assisted on another as South China triumphed, 2–0.

On 26 November 2014, Chan scored the deciding goal in the club's 2–1 victory over Eastern. Chairman Wallace Cheung determined that night to award Chan with a "brave gold shield" and award all future players with one if they followed Chan's work ethic and dedication. Chan remarked after receiving the award, "The club recently experienced a lot of adversity lately, but I hope that the fans will continue to focus on our results and push us on!"

On 18 March 2015, Chan scored a goal against Pahang en route to helping South China top their 2015 AFC Cup group and ensuring qualification into the Round of 16. Later in the month, he was named the HKPL March Player of the Month. At the end of the season, Chan was rewarded with a new contract.

For 2015–16, Chan was switched to central midfield and asked to take more free kicks, corners and throw-ins. On 23 October 2015, South China defeated Metro Gallery, 3–1, in their League Cup group stage encounter thanks to Chan's first goal of the domestic season. On 27 December 2015, Chan missed a penalty in a Senior Shield semi final shootout against Eastern, allowing the latter team to advance to the Final.

On 24 October 2016, South China were upset by Rangers, 4–2, leading Chan to vent "General loans out troops, soldiers fight their own! Ridiculous! Ridiculous!" on his Facebook page. This was reflecting that Lai Yiu Cheong, who had been loaned to Rangers by Rambo, scored two goals in the match against South China. The criticism was met by action on the part of the board the following day as manager Ricardo Rambo was demoted. On 2 November 2016, Chan scored his first goal under new manager Dejan Antonic in a 2–0 victory over R&F.

Pegasus
Frustrated by a lack of playing time under Antonic, Chan handed in a transfer request in early January 2017. His request was granted and on 27 January, Chan was sold for $200,000 HK to Pegasus with the player singing a two and a half-year contract with the club.

On 8 April 2018, Chan scored a crucial goal off a free kick to lead Pegasus to a 2–1 win over Eastern in the quarterfinals of the 2017–18 Hong Kong FA Cup.

On 6 June 2020, Chan announced he would retire from professional football and transition to a career in managing karaoke bars.

Chan contributed 4 goals in 17 matches in his last season as a professional, including 3 goals in the Sapling Cup and 1 goal in the HKPL.

International career

Chan has represented Hong Kong at both senior and under-23 international levels. He scored 9 goals in 15 games for the U-23 side and 40 goals in 70 games for the senior side.

Chan was urgently recalled by the Hong Kong U-23 team from Tottenham Hotspur for the final of 2009 East Asian Games on 12 December 2009. He arrived just before the match and was called into play at half-time. Two minutes after half-time, he equalised for Hong Kong. He also scored a penalty in the penalty shootout a.e.t, helping Hong Kong to their first international football tournament title. On winning the gold medal, he exclaimed to the assembled media: "We are gold medalists too!" (我哋都係金牌運動員！) The line has since been associated with him. Due to ligament injury to his left knee, Chan was replaced by Kitchee captain Lo Kwan Yee for the 2010 Asian Games.

In the second round of the preliminary competition of the 2010 East Asian Football Championship held in Kaohsiung in August 2009, he missed a penalty against North Korea but scored 4 goals against Guam. In a 2010 FIFA World Cup qualifying match, he scored a hat trick in a game against Timor-Leste, which Hong Kong went on to win 8–1. On 3 June 2011, Chan scored a goal against Malaysia in a friendly, adding his goal tally to 27 and helping him surpass Au Wai Lun to become Hong Kong's all-time top scorer. On 4 October, he scored the first goal in Hong Kong's 6–0 win over Chinese Taipei in the 2011 Long Teng Cup. Hong Kong thus successfully defended the trophy. he also won the Most Valuable Player award. On 29 February 2012, in Hong Kong's first match under new coach Ernie Merrick, Chan scored a hat-trick against Chinese Taipei as Hong Kong won the match 5–1.

Personal life
In 2009, soon after his move to South China and subsequent success with Hong Kong U-23, he became a celebrity in Hong Kong. His love life became a matter of interest to the local paparazzi. He was suspected to have committed adultery, after pictures of him and TVB actress Helen Lee had been leaked. He denied the accusations. He claimed to have broken up with Lee in August and gone back with Natalie in October.

Political views
He appeared on the government's television advertisement for the 2012 Legislative Council electoral reforms, in which he urged people to take their opportunity if they want to score a goal. The advertisement attracted a barrage of criticism against him on South China's official blog. Chan explained through his management company that he has no political views and he would not persuade people to support or oppose the LegCo reforms. He only accepted the invitation to appear in the advert due to the government's sincerity and he received no payment.

Endorsements
Chan is a spokesman for Jockey International along with teammate Man Pei Tak. Both claimed to be embarrassed at the photo shoot but were happy with the pay.

Honours
Kitchee
Hong Kong League Cup: 2005–06, 2006–07
Hong Kong Senior Shield: 2005–06

South China
Hong Kong First Division: 2008–09, 2009–10
Hong Kong Senior Shield: 2009–10
Hong Kong FA Cup: 2010–11
Hong Kong League Cup: 2010–11

Hong Kong
2009 East Asian Games football event: Gold

Individual
Hong Kong First Division League Best Young Player: 2003–04, 2004–05, 2006–07
Hong Kong First Division League Best Eleven Squad: 2008–09
East Asian Football Championship preliminary competition top scorer: 2009
Hong Kong FA Cup top scorer: 2008–09
Hong Kong Senior Challenge Shield Player of the Tournament: 2009–10
Hong Kong Senior Challenge Shield top scorer: 2009–10
MVP of the Long Teng Cup: 2011
Hong Kong Footballer of the Year: 2011

Career statistics

Club
Updated 23 August 2011

International

Hong Kong

International goals
Scores and results list Hong Kong's goal tally first.

Hong Kong U-23
Updated 9 January 2010

References

External links
 
 
 

1985 births
Living people
Hong Kong footballers
Association football forwards
Hong Kong Rangers FC players
Kitchee SC players
South China AA players
TSW Pegasus FC players
Guangdong Sunray Cave players
Hong Kong Premier League players
Hong Kong international footballers
Footballers at the 2006 Asian Games
Hong Kong expatriate footballers
Asian Games competitors for Hong Kong
Hong Kong League XI representative players